The European Institute of Women's Health (EIWH) is a women's and family health policy development institution. It was established in 1996, primarily to ensure women's and indeed all aspects of family health and well being were on the European and national member parliament's agendas. The EIWH, is an NGO, established as a company, no shares. Its administrative office is based in Dublin, Ireland and it is a registered charity.

Its work is aimed at positively influencing the European Parliament, European Commission and other international organisations and agencies to ensure the health, well-being of women in particular and their families are and remain a priority issue. They actively work to promote increased understanding of the roles of sex and gender as ways of increasing understanding, managing and so improving health for all.

Advisory roles 

The EIWH has a number of advisory roles to other organisations. This activity includes its work with:

 European Medicines Agency
 The European Cancer Partnership Second Joint Action 
 European Public Health Alliance, member of Policy Co-ordination Group 
 European Patients Forum, Member of Policy Committee 
 EFPIA Patient/Industry Think Tank 
 EU Fundamental Rights Agency, NGO Platform 
 European Centre for Disease Control and Prevention 
 EIP on Active and Healthy Ageing—Action Group on Falls Prevention, Strategic Implementation Plan of the European Innovation Partnership on Active and Healthy Ageing (EIP AHA)—Action A2 
 Member of Ethics Board of EHR4CR (Electronic Health Records for Clinical Research) WHO Women's Health Report 
 Horizon 2020 Steering Group for Societal Change 1 "Health, Demographic Change and Wellbeing
 Expert Advisor to WHO Women's Strategy 2016
 Cooperating partner in the World Congress on Women's Mental Health (March 2017)

Use of EIWH's work 
 European Institute of Women's Health (1996). Women in Europe towards healthy ageing, a review of the health status of mid-life and older women, Dublin: European Institute of Women's Health
 Cited in: 
 European Institute of Women's Health (2006). Women's health in Europe. Facts and figures across the European Union. Dublin: European Institute of Women's Health
 Cited in: 
 European Institute of Women's Health is also cited in:

External links 
Eurohealth Website

European Commission Transparency Register
 http://ec.europa.eu/transparencyregister/public/consultation/displaylobbyist.do?id=234045010359-36

Women's organisations based in Ireland
1996 establishments in Ireland
International medical associations of Europe
Medical and health organisations based in the Republic of Ireland
Organizations established in 1996